The following lists events that happened during 1988 in Spain.

Incumbents
 Monarch: Juan Carlos I
 Prime Minister: Felipe González

Events
 29 May: In the 1988 Catalan regional election, Jordi Pujol retains the regional presidency.
 14 December: The 1988 Spanish general strike ("14-D") takes place, in opposition to government economic reforms.

Arts and entertainment

Sports
 2 October: The Spanish Grand Prix takes place at the Circuito Permanente de Jerez, Jerez de la Frontera, and is won by Alain Prost of France.

Births
 8 January: Adrián López, footballer
 3 March: Rafael Muñoz, swimmer
 14 April: Roberto Bautista Agut, tennis player 
 28 April: Juan Mata, footballer
 16 July: Sergio Busquets, footballer
 7 October: Diego Costa, footballer
 17 October: Marina Salas, actress 
 21 October: Blanca Suárez, Spanish actress

Deaths
 26 December: Pablo Sorozábal, composer (b. 1897)

See also
 1988 in Spanish television
 List of Spanish films of 1988

References

 
Spain
Years of the 20th century in Spain
Spain
1980s in Spain